Heimbach is a town in the district of Düren in the state of North Rhine-Westphalia, Germany.

Heimbach may also refer to:

Places and rivers in Germany
 Heimbach (Nahe), a municipality in the district of Birkenfeld, in Rhineland-Palatinate
 a part of Mömbris in Bayern
 a part of Teningen in Baden-Württemberg
 a part of Bad Schwalbach in Hesse
 a part of Neuwied in Rheinland-Pfalz
 a part of Gilserberg in Hessen
Heimbach (Glatt), a river of Baden-Württemberg, tributary of the Glatt

Other
David Heimbach (born 1938), American surgeon and a professor emeritus of the University of Washington
Matthew Heimbach, founder of the Traditionalist Worker Party, a now disbanded American far-right group
Wolfgang Heimbach (1615–1678), Baroque painter
Heimbach Group, a supplier of textiles for the paper manufacturing, environmental technology and others

German-language surnames